Robert Campbell Ditchburn Snedden (20 March 1867 – 3 April 1931) was a Scottish-born South African rugby union footballer.

Biography
Snedden played only one Test for South Africa, in which he was captain, in 1891. He played for the Griqualand West province.

The British Isles rugby team embarked on a tour of South Africa in 1891, the season in which South Africa's national side would play its first ever match. Snedden did not play in the first Test, but was promoted into the lineup for the second match, and was named as skipper. He captained South Africa on 29 August 1891 against the British Isles in Kimberley. Only one try was scored in the game, by Great Britain, who won the contest 3 to nil. Snedden did not play in any more Tests for South Africa. He died in Liskeard, England in 1931, aged 64.

He was also a good enough cricketer to play a first-class match for Griqualand West in the 1889/90 season.

Test history

See also
List of South Africa national rugby union players – Springbok no. 18
List of South Africa national rugby union team captains

References

External links
Bob Snedden on the Springbok Rugby Hall of Fame
Match data
Cricinfo: Robert Snedden

1867 births
1931 deaths
South African rugby union players
South Africa international rugby union players
South African cricketers
Griqualand West cricketers
Rugby union players from Dunfermline
Scottish cricketers
Scottish rugby union players
Scottish emigrants to South Africa
Rugby union forwards
Griquas (rugby union) players